Kibulala may refer to one of the following:

 Kibulala, Hoima - A hill in Hoima District, Western Uganda.
 Kibulala, Ssingo - A hill in Ssingo County, Kiboga District, Central Uganda.